Duryodhana also known as Suyodhana, is the primary antagonist in the Hindu epic Mahabharata. He was the eldest of the Kauravas, the hundred sons of the blind king Dhritarashtra and his queen Gandhari.

Being the first-born son of the blind king, he was the crown prince of the Kuru Kingdom and its capital of Hastinapura, often forced into ceding the title to his cousin Yudhishthira, who was one of the Pandava brothers and older than him. Aided by his maternal uncle Shakuni, Duryodhana tricked the Pandavas into surrendering their kingdom and forced them to go into exile. Later, Duryodhana waged the Kurukshetra War against his cousins and was helped by the warriors Bhishma, Drona and Karna. On the eighteenth day of the war, he was killed by Bheema. Duryodhana used his greater skill in wielding the mace to defeat his opponents. He was also an extremely courageous warrior and was said to be a good ruler, but his greed and arrogance were the two qualities said to have led to his downfall.

Birth

When Gandhari's pregnancy continued for an unusually long period of time, Her mother-in-law Ambika and Ambalika were very upset with her. Pandu and Kunti earlier bore a son whom they named Yudhishthira. So she beat her womb in frustration. This caused a hardened mass of grey-coloured flesh to issue from her womb. She implored Vyasa, the great sage who had blessed her as "Shata Putra Praptirasthu" (Sanskrit for "blessed with a hundred sons"), to redeem his words. Vyasa divided the ball of flesh into one hundred and one equal pieces and put them in pots of milk, which were sealed and buried into the earth for two years. At the end of the second year, the first pot was opened, and Duryodhana emerged.

Early years

Although loved by his family, Duryodhana and most of his brothers were not seen on the same level as the Pandavas in their adherence to virtue, duty, and respect for elders. Duryodhana felt that the partiality everyone showed to the Pandavas was only due to the circumstances of their birth. Duryodhana was mentored by his maternal uncle Shakuni, who masterminded most of Duryodhana's plots to humiliate and kill the Pandavas.

Duryodhana's hatred for the Pandavas stemmed from his sincere belief that he being the son of the eldest brother should be the heir apparent to the throne of Hastinapura. Because of his father's (Dhritarashtra) blindness, his father had to renounce the throne in favour of his younger brother, Pandu. Duryodhana deeply believed that what was rightfully his was being given away to his older cousin Yudhishthira. He also felt that the Pandavas were the sons of Kunti and devas/deities, and not of Pandu. He never believed that their divine origin alone proved their superiority. On many occasions he questioned their merits and always called them 'Kaunteya' (sons of Kunti). He would never accept the Pandavas as his brothers but always did his best to restrain them. He also bore a deep hatred of Bhima, who was older than him but much stronger and dominated his brothers in sport and skill with his immense physical power and strength. Out of anger and jealousy, he even tried to poison Bheem, but was unsuccessful.

Training

Learning martial skills from his gurus Dronacharya, he proved to be extremely skilled with the mace. He then went to specialize in mace fighting under Balarama, so as to gain sympathy from him and went on to become his favourite pupil. Balarama described Duryodhana's body to be "lightning made flesh" and declared him to be the greatest mace fighter of his generation.

Relationship with Karna
At the martial exhibition where the Kaurava and Pandava princes demonstrated their skills before their elders, their guru Drona and the people of that kingdom, Karna appeared and challenged an unsuspecting Arjuna, who is considered to be the best of the princes. But Karna was stopped when Kripa asked him to ascertain his lineage, as it would be inappropriate for unequal to compete. Karna, not being a kshatriya, bowed his head in shame.

Duryodhana immediately defended Karna, arguing that it is skill and bravery, and not birth, that defines a warrior. Using the boon granted to him by Dhritarashtra, Duryodhana made Karna king of Anga so that he was regarded as Arjuna's equal. Karna pledged his allegiance and friendship to Duryodhana. Neither of them knew that Karna was in fact Kunti's oldest son, born to (the sun god) Surya, before her marriage to Pandu.

In the Kurukshetra War, Karna was Duryodhana's greatest champion and served as commander from the fifteenth day. Duryodhana sincerely believed that Karna was superior to Arjuna, and would defeat his four brothers. When Karna was killed, Duryodhana mourned his death intensely, even more so than the death of his own brothers and was inconsolable. When Karna's identity was revealed to him, Duryodhana's love for Karna only grew and it is said to be he, and not the Pandavas, who performed Karna's last rites. Krishna confirmed that he had the highest right over Karna, as they loved and supported each other truly.

Tendencies and schemes

During their childhood, Bhima used his brute strength to inflict injuries on the Kaurava brothers. As Bhima was gluttonous, Duryodhana, guided by Shakuni attempted to kill Bhima by feeding him poison, but Bhima survived the trap and emerged even stronger than before. Duryodhana then participated in a plot by Shakuni to burn the Pandavas in a house of wax at Varnavata; however, they managed to escape the trap having been warned by Vidura.

Marriage and children 
In the Shanti Parva, the divine-sage Narada narrated the marriage of Duryodhana with the daughter of King Chitrangada of Kalinga. The wife of Duryodhana is unnamed in the original epic, and named Bhanumati in later renditions and adaptations of the pic.

Duryodhana abducted her from her swayamvara (self-choice ceremony) with the help of his friend Karna in the wake of having been rejected by her. On reaching Hastinapur, Duryodhana justified his act by giving the example of his great grandfather Bhishma abducting three princesses of Kashi for his stepbrother.

Laxman Kumara and Lakshmanā were the children of Duryodhana and Bhanumati. Little is revealed about them in the Mahabharata other than Laxman's death in the Kurukshetra War and Laxmanaa's marriage to Krishna's son Samba.

Usurping the Kingdom

After the Pandavas revealed that they had survived the wax house, with a new wife to boot, Bhishma suggested that the kingdom be divided in order to ease the obvious tension. Yudhishthira is given half the kingdom and made king of Khandavprastha, so as to avoid a clash with the Kaurava princes over the whole Kuru Kingdom. Duryodhana became the crown prince of Hastinapura, and owing to the age and blindness of his father, he accumulated much control and influence, managing the state affairs himself with a group of his advisers that included his uncle Shakuni, brother Dushasana, Bhishma, Vidura, and Karna.

But Duryodhana remained jealous of Yudhishthira, especially after the Pandavas along with Krishna transformed Khandavaprastha to Indraprastha. Moreover, Yudhishthira performed the Rajasuya Yagna and gained authority over several other kingdoms; Indraprastha's prosperity and fame appeared to exceed Hastinapura's. Duryodhana was unable to contain his anger, which was intensified when Bhima, Arjuna, the twins and the servants laughed at him when he slipped into a pool of water during a visit to Indraprastha.

In popular culture, television shows and post-modern novels on Mahabharata attribute this blame to Draupadi with an added statement "the son of the blind man also is blind", but the scene in the canonical text of Vyasa's Sanskrit epic is different. As per original scripture written by Ved Vyasa Draupadi didn't taunt Duryodhana.
This enraged Duryodhana and increases his hostility towards the Pandavas.

The dice plot, and Draupadi's humiliation

Duryodhana's jealousy of the prosperity and fame of Indraprastha and being humiliated by the Pandavas made him furious and he wished to throw down the Pandavas. To support his will, Shakuni devised a scheme to rob Yudhishthira of his kingdom and wealth by defeating him in a Pakida or game of dice, in which Shakuni couldn't lose as he had dices which he could control.

Unable to decline the invitation, due to diplomacy, Yudhishthira gambled away his entire kingdom, his wealth, his four brothers and even his wife, in a series of gambits to retrieve one by staking another. After Yudhishthira lost Draupadi, Duryodhana encouraged his brother Dushasana to drag her into the court as she was now his property. Dushsana pulled Draupadi's hair and dragged her into the court. Duryodhana ordered Draupadi to sit on his left thigh, showing and patting it to insult her for revenge. Draupadi refused and Duryodhan ordered Dushashan to disrobe her. Following his brother's orders, Dushashan laughed and started pulling Draupadi's saree. Duryodhan, Shakuni, Karna and the other Kauravas (except Vikarna) also started laughing. However, by Krishna's grace, Draupadi's amount of clothing remained the same.

Due to this action, Bhima pledged that he would break Duryodhana's thigh.

As an enraged Draupadi was about to curse the Kuru clan, Gandhari intervened. Fearing retribution by the Pandavas, their allies, and history, Dhritarashtra and Gandhari reversed all of Yudhishthira's losses. But then (either through Duryodhana forcing his father to command the Pandavas to play again or through Shakuni's vicious tricks) the game was repeated. For this game of dice Shakuni set the condition that upon losing, Yudhishthira and his brothers must spend thirteen years in exile in the forest and one year of Agyatavasa (remain unknown to others possibly by a disguise) before they reclaim their kingdom. The thirteenth year must be passed incognito, or else the term of exile would be repeated. The Pandavas lost and began their exile.

Virata War
Duryodhana was a good friend of Matsya Kingdom's commander-in-chief Kichaka. When Bhima killed him for humiliating Draupadi, Duryodhana blamed Matsya's King Virata for his friend Kichaka's death. Virata got angry and ordered Duryodhana to get out of his Kingdom after insulting him. Duryodhana took his army and attacked Matsya. He ordered his wife's cousin Susharma to attack Matsya from other side but they failed to conquer it because Arjuna and Bhima defended it.

The Kurukshetra War

Peace Talks and Buildup

At the end of the exile term, Duryodhana refused to return Yudhishthira's kingdom, despite the counsel of Bhishma, Dronacharya, and Vidura. Although Dhritarashtra openly criticized his son, he tacitly desired that Duryodhana retain his throne. In a final attempt at securing peace, Krishna returned with the Pandavas' final proposal: the Pandavas would give up all claims to Indraprastha and Hastinapura in exchange for five villages. Scoffing, Duryodhana said he will not even give even a needlepoint of land to the Pandavas. Egged on by Krishna, Duryodhana attempted to arrest him. Krishna revealed his Vishvarupa form. The entire Kaurava court, saved for Bhishma, Drona, Vidura, and Dhritarashtra (who was granted a divine vision in order to see that by supporting his son, he was going against God), was temporarily blinded by the form. This confirmed to those present that Krishna was indeed the Surpreme being. Duryodhana, being vastly egoistic (in some versions of the story an outright atheist), brushed off the incident, not convinced of Krishna's divinity, and believing that strength of arms, not philosophy, would win him a war.

Gathering the army

With war inevitable, Duryodhana gathered support from his powerful vassals. The most powerful warriors – Bhishma, Drona, Karna, Kripa, Shalya, Bhurisravas, Ashwatthama, even those who were critical of him were forced to fight for Duryodhana due to their previous commitments. He ended up amassing a larger army than his rivals.

Shakuni also advised Duryodhana to seek Krishna's help. Duryodhana rushed to Dwarika only to find Krishna sleeping; he waited at the head of Krishna's bed when suddenly, Arjuna arrived with the same goal in mind. Arjuna waited at the foot of Krishna's bed. When Krishna woke up, both Duryodhana and Arjuna appealed for his alliance. Krishna offered a choice of himself, completely unarmed or the entire Vrishni army. Duryodhana proclaimed that because he arrived first, he should get first pick. However, Krishna said that because he saw Arjuna first and because Arjuna was younger, that Arjuna gets the first choice. Duryodhana became worried but was overjoyed when Arjuna elected to reject Krishna's army in favour of Krishna alone. Joyously, Duryodhana returned to Hastinapura with the Vrishni army in hand, only to be rebuked by Shakuni, who comments that Krishna is worth many armies by himself.

Duryodhana also managed to win the army of Shalya, the maternal uncle of Nakula and Sahadeva. Duryodhana intercepted Shalya's army as it came to Kurukshetra and offered hospitality; Shalya accepted thinking Yudhishthira had made the offer. After Shalya had enjoyed Duryodhana's comforts, Duryodhana revealed the duplicity and indicated that Shalya is now indebted to him. He used this indebtedness to extract Shalya's army and support. Duryodhana wanted Shalya mainly so that Karna would have an equivalent charioteer to Arjuna's Krishna.

4th day
Bhima attacked Duryodhana, pierced him and cut off his bow. In return, Duryodhana pierced Bhima, his Charioteer and cut off his bow. Duryodhana pierced Bhima with shafts on his breast. Bhima feeling great pain fled away from the battlefield.

8th day 
On the 8th day, Rakashasaas of Ghatotkacha's army attacked Duryodhana. Duryodhana slew many rakshasas like Vegavat, Maharudra, Vidyujihva and Pramathin. Later, he killed Visharada, son of Kunti-Bhoja.

14th day 
Uttamauja and Yudhamanyu (sons of Drupad) attacked Duryodhana and Duryodhana defeated them in mace fighting. After the death of Jayadratha, Duryodhana became very angry and he started killing the Pandava army. However, he is later defeated by Yudhishthira and flees.

15th day 
Nakula attacked Duryodhana. Duryodhana fought with him and defeated Nakula, forcing him to flee. On the sixteenth day, he tried to face Yudishthira and bravely withstood his onslaught. But soon, Yudishthira defeated him and destroyed his chariot. Luckily, he was rescued by Karna.

17th day 
Nakula and Sahadeva attacked Duryodhana. Duryodhana pierced them and nearly killed them. Later, Dhrishtadyumna saved them. Then many Pandava warriors, including Yudhishthira, Bhima, Dristadyumna, Satyaki, etc. all together attacked Duryodhana. However Duryodhana alone managed to resist all the Pandavas and he repelled the Pandavas' group attack single-handedly.

18th day 
On the 18th day, the Pandavas together had attacked Duryodhana but they were unsuccessful as Duryodhana alone resisted and defeated all of them. Duryodhana had also killed a Yadava warrior named Chekitana on that day. Later, he tried to defeat Dhrishtadyumna who was destroying the retreating Kaurava army. However, Dhrishtadyumna killed Duryodhana's charioteer and destroyed his chariot, forcing Duryodhana to flee. He was the one of the only warriors who was able to defeat Duryodhana that day.

Gada-Yuddha

On the eighteenth day of the war, with his army reduced to himself, Ashwatthama, Kripa and Kritvarma, Duryodhana went to meditate in a lake. When the Pandavas and Krishna eventually found him, Duryodhana told them that he wanted to gift the kingdom to them, and retire to the forest. Yudhishthira rejected the offer, telling him that Hastinapur is not Duryodhana's to gift. Instead, he offered that Duryodhana may pick any of the Pandava brothers to fight against one-to-one with a weapon of his choice, with the winner of the conflict the victor of the war.

Despite his proposed advantage over Yudhishthira, Arjuna, Nakula, or Sahadeva with the gada, Duryodhana picked his nemesis Bhima. Despite Bhima's physical advantage, Duryodhana had the better technique due to his devotion to his craft. After a long and brutal battle between the two disciples of Balarama, Duryodhana began to exhaust Bhima and nearly made Bhima faint.

At this point, Krishna, observing the fight, called out to Bhima and signalled him by repeatedly clapping his own thigh with his hand. As intended, Bhima was reminded of an oath he had taken after the game of dice to crush Duryodhana's thighs. Bhima victoriously attacked Duryodhana with his mace and struck his thigh, mortally wounding Duryodhana. After having his face insultingly kicked by Bhima, Duryodhana bemoaned that he was slain by unfair means, given that it was illegal to attack below the waist in a mace fight.

Infuriated at the violation, Balarama, the brother of Lord Krishna, raised his weapon to attack. Lord Krishna consoled Balarama, by reminding him of Duryodhana's evil deeds, and reprimanded him for trying to influence a war he refused to participate in.

Lying defeated, Duryodhana boasted to the Pandavas about how he would die a glorious death, about how he got to enjoy Hastinapur while the Pandavas were in exile, and about how he would now spend the afterlife in the company of his friends and relatives. He again eviscerated the Pandavas for all their chicanery during the war and decried their legacy. Venerating his own character, Duryodhana proclaimed he will die happily.

Death

When the coast was clear, Ashwatthama, Kripacharya, and Kritvarma, having witnessed the fight and not wanting to interrupt so as to rob Duryodhana of his honor, came to Duryodhana's broken body. Ashwatthama promised Duryodhana that he would dispatch the Pandavas and their allies to the abode of Yama and requests his permission to continue the war. 
 
Ashwatthama proceeds to the encampment and into Drishtadyumna's tent at night while everybody of Pandava camp were sleeping. Drishtadyumna awakens from his sleep, and begs Ashwatthama not to kill him cowardly at night and unarmed, and let him die a warrior's death with an appropriate duel. Ashwatthama ignores his plea and beats him to death. The Upapandavas and Shikhandhi alerted by Drishtadyumn's cries, came out of their tents to battle, only to be slain. Ashwatthama proceeds to massacre everyone in the encampment while any escapees were slain by Kripacharya and Kritvarma at the gates of the encampment.

After killing the Upapandavas and the last remnants of the Panchalas, Ashwatthama returns to Duryodhana. He showed Duryodhana the blood on his sword which belonged to the Upapandavas, hearing Duryodhana peacefully left his body satisfied with revenge. Concomitant with Duryodhana's death, Sanjaya loses his divine sight, which he had been using to update Duryodhana's father Dhritarashtra. This symbolizes the conclusion to the war.

After the Pandavas retired, only Yudhishthira reached heaven alive. There, he saw Duryodhana, which shocked him. When asked by Yudhishthira, Narada replied that Duryodhana fulfilled his religious duties.

Evaluation

Duryodhana is a popular choice of analysis. His merits, flaws, symbolism, and relevance are widely discussed.

Urubhangam is a Sanskrit play written by Bhasa in the 2nd or 3rd century AD with Duryodhana as its primary protagonist. Written as a tragedy, the drama focuses on his point of view of the events of Mahabharata. His portrayal as a tragic hero is especially unique within the body of works in Sanskrit drama.

Many Hindus believe that Duryodhana was the personification of Kali with demoniac qualities such as greed, ego and lust. Many critics argue that he is not without positives; many consider Duryodhana as a fair king and there are temples dedicated to him and the Kauravas. Scholars believe that like most other characters of the Mahabharata, the true picture is not black and white. His name is often mistaken to mean bad ruler, however, his name is actually coined from the Sanskrit words "du"/"duh" which means "difficult" and "yodhana" which means "fight"/"war". So Duryodhana actually means someone who is extremely difficult to fight/defeat or wage war against.

Duryodhana is viewed, by some, as the product of Dhritarashtra's ambition and also in a metaphorical sense, his "blindness". He is also praised for his adherence to his duties as a Kshatriya, and even in his last combat, fights bravely. He chooses to face Bhima in combat over all the other Pandavas, with whom he has an advantage in mace fighting. His skills in the mace are also praised; many stories call him the greatest mace-fighter of the age after Balarama, Krishna and Bheema.

Friendship with Karna

The friendship between Karna and Duryodhana is considered to be a great one, and is used as an example of friendship and loyalty. 
A lesser-known story is told about Karna, Duryodhana, and his wife Bhanumati, as an example of honest friendship.
With the help of Karna, Duryodhana married Bhanumati. According to the Mahabharata, Duryodhana abducted Bhanumati, the maiden of the fairest complexion, from her swayamvara with the help of his best friend Karna in the wake of having been rejected by her.

As per a Tamil folktale, when Duryodhana had recently wedded Bhanumati, one day, he requested Karna to take care of her and entertain her for the evening as he had duties to be taken care of. To pass time, Karna and Bhanumati began playing a game of dice. The game soon got very interesting, engrossing the two of them completely. Gradually, Karna started winning. Meanwhile, Duryodhana had returned early and entered the room. Seeing her husband come in, Bhanumati immediately stood up as a mark of respect. Karna, whose back was facing the door, did not realize this and misconstrued her intent, thinking that she was leaving because she was on the losing side.

He immediately reached for her pearl-trimmed shawl, and accidentally pulled so hard that the trimming broke, and the pearls were scattered all over the floor. Her veil also slipped along with the shawl, so she was half-dressed. Bhanumati, who was as yet, not so familiar with Karna, froze at the thought of how her husband would react. She had heard of his ego and had personally been present the last time he was insulted, which had resulted in her own abduction.

Karna, following Bhanumati's stunned gaze, turned around to see Duryodhana observing them both carefully. He stood in shame, embarrassment and guilt, considering the wrath and inevitable punishment he was going to face from his friend. He was sure Duryodhana would immediately accuse them of impropriety. However, much to both their surprise, Duryodhana looked past Karna, and addressed his wife, "Should I just collect the beads, or would you like me to string them, as well?”

Bhanumati and Karna could only look at each other in shock, mutely, feeling ashamed at the way they had both severely misjudged him. He had implicit faith and great love for his queen, and even greater was his faith in his friend Karna. Not for a moment did he suspect that the man he had considered his brother would ever betray him, and only quietly picked up the pearls trustfully. This story is not present in the Vyasa Mahabharata, but is often commonly told when discussing Karna and Duryodhana's genuine friendship.

Modern Worship
 At Poruvazhy Peruviruthy Malanada Temple in Kerala's Kollam district, Duryodhana is worshipped as the main deity. It is the only temple in South India where a Kaurava is considered a God.
 In the Kumaon region of Uttarakhand, several beautifully carved temples are dedicated to Duryodhana and he is worshipped as the deity. The mountain tribes of Kumaon fought along with Duryodhana in the Mahabharata war; he was venerated as a capable and generous administrator.
 There is a temple in Osla, Garhwal division of Uttarakhand. This was built by the inhabitants of Saur. People believe he stayed here with the blessings of Lord Mahasu to care for the people.

In media 
 Krishnavatara (Hindi: कृष्णअवतार), a series of seven novels written by Dr. K.M. Munshi (Bharatiya Vidya Bhavan)
 Duryodhana by Viswanathan Raghunathan (2014, Harper Collins).

Television & films 
Mammootty played a character based on Duryodhana in the 1991 Kollywood film Thalapathi. The theme of the film is based on the friendship between Karna and Duryodhana.
Manoj Bajpayee played a character based on Duryodhana in the 2010 Bollywood film Raajneeti.

See also
Kaurava
Kali (demon)
Mahabharata

References

External links

Duryodhana Temples and Lineage
karna great personalities
THE RELEVANCE OF “KARNA AND DURYODHANA’S” FRIENDSHIP IN THE MODERN INDIAN SOCIETY
From Duryodhana's perspective

Characters in the Mahabharata
Forms of Kali (demon)